Piyale Pasha  (c. 1515-1578) was an Ottoman admiral

Piyale Paşa or Piyale Pasha may also refer to:
 Piyale Paşa, Güzelyurt, town in Northern Cyprus
HMS Meteor (G73), renamed Piyale Paşa after sale to Turkish navy in 1959
USS Fiske (DD-842), renamed Piyale Paşa after sale to Turkish navy in 1980